Ordinary Man may refer to:

Ordinary Man (Christy Moore album) (1985)
Ordinary Man (Kiosk album) (2005)
Ordinary Man (Ozzy Osbourne album) (2020)
"Ordinary Man" (Ozzy Osbourne song) (2020)

See also
An Ordinary Man (disambiguation)